Hieria (in Greek variously ), also known as Heraeum  or Heraion (Ἡραῖον), modern Fenerbahçe, was a town of ancient Bithynia and a suburb of Byzantine-era Constantinople (modern Istanbul, Turkey). It is prominent in the city's history as the site of an imperial palace.

The name derives from Heraion akron (Greek: , "Cape of Hera"), which was given in antiquity to a small promontory (modern Fener burnu) on the Asian shore of the Bosporus, opposite Chalcedon (modern Kadıköy). The Emperor Justinian I (r. 527–565) built a palace here, which included a harbour and a church dedicated to St. Mary. The palace, which survived at least until 1203, served as a summer residence for a number of Byzantine emperors, including Emperor Heraclius (r. 610–641) and Emperor Basil I (r. 867–886), who added a chapel dedicated to the Prophet Elijah. Due to its location on the Asian side of the Bosporus, the palace often served as a reception point for triumphal returns of the Byzantine emperors from campaigns in the East. The iconoclastic "Council of Hieria" took place in the palace in 754. Only a few traces of the original palace complex (the harbour breakwater, a cistern and funerary inscriptions) survive.

Its site is located at Fenerbahçe in Asiatic Turkey.

References

Sources

Byzantine palaces
Quarters and suburbs of Constantinople
Former populated places in Turkey
Populated places in Bithynia